Semen Yosypovych Altman (born 21 April 1946 in Chuhuiv) is a Ukrainian football coach and former goalkeeper. He is of Jewish ancestry.

Semen's son, Hennadiy Altman is also a goalkeeper and has followed his father to many of the teams Semen has coached over the years.

Career 
Altman played for Kolhospnyk (Rivne), Volyn (Lutsk), Chornomorets (Odessa), Zvezda (Tiraspol), Lokomotiv (Kherson).

Coach 
He has worked as a coach of FC Chornomorets Odesa (1982–88), FC Dynamo Moscow (1989–91), Chornomorets (1991–94), Korea Olympic team (1994–96), FC Zimbru Chișinău (1996–99), Metalurh Donetsk (1999–2002), and Chornomorets again (2003–2007). Semen Altman was also Oleh Blokhin's assistant coach for the Ukraine national football team from 2003 to 2006. In 2007 Altman was replaced by Vitaliy Shevchenko at Chornomorets. In 2007, he was hired by FC Illychivets Mariupol as head coach on a one-year contract. On 14 December 2007, Semen was unexpectedly sacked, despite winning the first leg of the quarterfinal Ukrainian Cup match against his former club Chornomorets, and the club sitting in 2nd place at the time. In October 2008 he was appointed as head-coach of FC Luch-Energiya Vladivostok.

Honours

As Coach
2006 FIFA World Cup
Quarter-finalist (as assistant-coach)
Ukrainian Premier League
Bronze medals: 2001–02, 2002–03 (both with Metalurh Donetsk); 2005–06 (with Chornomorets Odessa)
Moldovan National Division (all with FC Zimbru Chișinău)
Champion: 1997–98, 1998–99
Silver medals:  1996–97
Moldova Cup
Winner: 1996–97, 1997–98

References

External links
Chornormorets sign Shevchenko at UEFA.com
Profile at KLISF

1946 births
Living people
People from Chuhuiv
Ukrainian footballers
Ukrainian football managers
NK Veres Rivne players
FC Volyn Lutsk players
FC Zvezda Tiraspol players
FC Chornomorets Odesa players
FC Chornomorets Odesa managers
FC Dynamo Moscow managers
FC Zimbru Chișinău managers
FC Metalurh Donetsk managers
FC Mariupol managers
FC Luch Vladivostok managers
SC Tavriya Simferopol managers
Russian Premier League managers
Expatriate football managers in Russia
Expatriate football managers in Moldova
Ukrainian Premier League managers
Soviet footballers
Jewish footballers
Ukrainian expatriate football managers
Ukrainian expatriate sportspeople in Russia
Ukrainian expatriate sportspeople in Moldova
Ukrainian expatriate sportspeople in South Korea
Association football goalkeepers
Odesa Jews
Moldovan Super Liga managers
K. D. Ushinsky South Ukrainian National Pedagogical University alumni